Events from the year 1586 in India.

Events
 Hazira Maqbara, a mausoleum of Qutb-ud-din Muhammad Khan, is built

Births
 Banarasidas, Shrimal Jain businessman and poet (died 1643)

Deaths
 Birbal, Wazīr-e Azam of the Mughal court (born 1528)

See also

 Timeline of Indian history